A sound archive, also known as an audio archive, is a collection of official records or files of sound recordings, broadcasts, or performances. Often these kind of archive consists of radio programmes.

Examples of large sound archives include the British Library Sound Archive, Internet Archive's Audio Archive, and the Australian National Film and Sound Archive.

See also
 List of sound archives

References